"Honey Come Back" is a song written by Jimmy Webb, and recorded by the American country music artist Glen Campbell. It was released in January 1970 as the second single from his album Try a Little Kindness. The song peaked at number 2 on the Billboard Hot Country Singles chart. It also reached number 1 on the RPM Country Tracks chart in Canada.

A video was produced for the song, featuring Campbell sitting by a fireplace composing a letter – presumably of his thoughts and feelings for his girlfriend, who has left him. The video has aired on Great American Country.

Versions by other artists
The song was first recorded in 1965 by singer Dorsey Burnette during his stint at Motown's country subsidiary Mel-o-dy. It was not issued at the time and only resurfaced in 2006, when it appeared on the compilation The Complete Motown Recordings 1964-1965. The first released version was by the Motown singer Chuck Jackson, whose single reached number 43 on the R&B charts in 1969. In December 1969, Don Ho also released it as a single.

Campbell's 1970 single was one of many recordings of the song that year - there were versions by:
 Johnny Mathis (on the album Raindrops Keep Fallin' On My Head)
 Patti Page (on the album Honey Come Back)
 David Rogers (on the album A World Called You)
 Ray Conniff and The Singers (on the album Bridge Over Troubled Water)
 Roy Drusky (on the album I'll Make Amends)
 Lynn Anderson (on the album Stay There 'Til I Get There)
 Bill Anderson (on his album Love is a Sometimes Thing)
 Jimmy Ruffin (on his album The Groove Governor; it also appeared as a B-side on a 1971 single)
 Junior Walker & the All-Stars (on their album A Gassssssssss!)
 Sandler & Young on their album, also entitled Honey Come Back)
 Peggy Sue (on her album All American Husband).
 LeBrón Brothers (on their album Salsa y Control with the song title of "Regresa a mí") .

Chart performance (Glen Campbell version)

Weekly charts

The Peddlers

Year-end charts

References

1970 singles
Glen Campbell songs
Songs written by Jimmy Webb
Capitol Records singles
Song recordings produced by Al De Lory
1970 songs